Christina Schultz (born 10 November 1969) was a  German female volleyball player. She was part of the Germany women's national volleyball team.

She competed with the national team at the 2000 Summer Olympics in Sydney, Australia, finishing 6th.

See also
 Germany at the 2000 Summer Olympics

References

External links
 
 http://www.cev.lu/Competition-Area/PlayerDetails.aspx?TeamID=1556&PlayerID=20403&ID=73
 http://volleyball.de/hall-of-fame/details/datum/2014/08/19/schultz-christina/
 http://www.spiegel.de/sport/sonst/volleyball-christina-schultz-zurueck-in-schwerin-a-46439.html
 
 https://www.munzinger.de/search/portrait/Christina+Schultz/1/4383.html
 http://www.schwaebische.de/home_artikel,-_arid,528607.html
 http://www.gettyimages.com/detail/news-photo/christina-schultz-ger-news-photo/52810299#christina-schultzger-picture-id52810299

1969 births
Living people
German women's volleyball players
People from Güstrow
Volleyball players at the 1996 Summer Olympics
Volleyball players at the 2000 Summer Olympics
Olympic volleyball players of Germany
Sportspeople from Mecklenburg-Western Pomerania